Arctogeron is a genus of flowering plants in the family Asteraceae.

There is only one known species, Arctogeron gramineum, native to Siberia, Mongolia, and Kazakhstan.

References

External links

Monotypic Asteraceae genera
Astereae
Flora of temperate Asia